The Růžovský vrch, also Růžák (German: Rosenberg) is the dominant mountain (619 m) in the Bohemian Switzerland east of the River Elbe in the Czech Republic. Its almost circular cone shape makes it one of the most typical representatives of the mountains of  North Bohemia. The upper part of the mountain is made of basalt, whilst at its foot  sandstone is also found. The flanks of the mountain are covered by an almost virgin deciduous forest, in which mighty beech and sycamore are especially impressive. Since 1973 the mountain has been protected as a national nature reserve and, since 2000, it has lain within the core zone of the Bohemian Switzerland National Park.

External links 
Information about the Rosenberg
Information about the Rosenberg (Sächsische Schweiz Initiative)

Mountains and hills of the Czech Republic
Mountains and hills of Bohemian Switzerland
Mountains under 1000 metres